American Medical News was an American newspaper that covered business, policy, public health and legal issues affecting physician practices. American Medical News offered 24 print issues each year, and 52 online editions, with fresh news added each weekday. First published by the American Medical Association as The AMA News in 1958, it was renamed in 1969 to reflect its broadened coverage. Most copies were distributed free as an AMA benefit of membership and to some non-member physicians, with internal medicine and family practice accounting for the majority of readers. The paper was intended to serve as an impartial and credible forum for information affecting physicians and their practices.

The newspaper was shut down in 2013.

References

External links 
 

1958 establishments in Illinois
2013 disestablishments in Illinois
American Medical Association
Defunct newspapers published in Chicago
Publications established in 1958
Publications disestablished in 2013